The 1959–60 Football League season was Birmingham City Football Club's 57th in the Football League and their 33rd in the First Division. They finished in 19th position in the 22-team division. They lost their opening third-round 1959–60 FA Cup-tie to Watford. In the 1958–60 Inter-Cities Fairs Cup, Birmingham reached the final, in which they lost 4–1 on aggregate to Barcelona.

Twenty-two players made at least one appearance in senior first-team competition, and there were fifteen different goalscorers. Half backs Trevor Smith and Johnny Watts played in 46 of the 47 first-team matches over the season, and Johnny Gordon finished as leading goalscorer with 19 goals in all competitions, of which 16 were scored in the league.

Pat Beasley resigned as manager at the end of May 1960, to be replaced by club appearance record-holder Gil Merrick following his retirement as a player.

Football League First Division

League table (part)

FA Cup

Inter-Cities Fairs Cup

The early rounds of the 1958–60 Inter-Cities Fairs Cup were completed during Birmingham's 1958–59 season, leaving the semi-finals and final to be played this season. In the semi-final, Birmingham beat Belgian club Union Saint-Gilloise 4–2 in each leg to reach the final, in which they played Barcelona, who had eliminated them at the semi-final stage in the previous edition of the competition.

The first leg of the final was played in "bitter, slanting rain" on a St Andrew's pitch that "almost from one goal to the other down the centre, was a series of little lakes". Birmingham played a "fast, open game" more suited to the conditions, while Barcelona's technical superiority was blunted both by the mud and by the "hard-tackling, grafting, bustling Birmingham defence, in which Smith and Neal in particular stood out like rocks long before the end". In the second half, Barcelona tired; El Mundo Deportivo noted that they had played a league match in Seville only 48 hours earlier and the players were not machines. The home side had three good chances: Ramallets dived at Hooper's feet, Weston ran the ball out of play when under no pressure, and a "sliding tackle from nowhere by Gensana turned away what looked like a certain goal", again for Weston.

The Times correspondent's fears that Birmingham had missed their opportunity – "here was a setting that favoured Birmingham's particular style, and they did not win" – were realised in the second leg. In a one-sided match in front of a crowd of 75,000, Barcelona were two goals up after six minutes, and doubled their tally before Murphy broke down the left and sent a long pass towards Hooper, whose mobility helped him beat Ramallets to the ball and score with a header.

Appearances and goals

Players with name struck through and marked  left the club during the playing season.

See also
Birmingham City F.C. seasons

ReferencesGeneral 
 
 Source for match dates and results: 
 Source for lineups, appearances, goalscorers and attendances: Matthews (2010), Complete Record, pp. 354–55, 474.
 Source for kit: "Birmingham City". Historical Football Kits. Retrieved 22 May 2018.Specific'

Birmingham City F.C. seasons
Birmingham City